Palmatius was a  Christian saint martyred with 11 companions in Trier in around 287. They were among many killed under the Emperor Maximian by Rictius Varus, the vicarius in Roman Gaul.

His feast day is May 10.

References

3rd-century Christian saints
Saints of Germania
287 deaths